Caught by a Wave is a 2021 coming-of-age romance film directed by Massimiliano Camaiti, based on a screenplay written by Camaiti and Claudia Bottino. Produced by the Italian company Cinemaundici, the film stars Elvira Camarrone and Roberto Christian as two high school students who fall in love after meeting at a regatta-oriented summer camp on Sicily, though their romance is soon complicated when Camarrone's character, Sara, is diagnosed with muscular dystrophy. The film was released on Netflix on March 25, 2021.

Originally produced in Italian, the film features Donatella Finocchiaro, Corrado Invernizzi, and Vincenzo Amato, and features the voices of Anne Yatco and Josh Zuckerman in the English dub.

Plot 
Two high school students, Sara (16 years old) and Lorenzo (17 years old) meet in a summer camp and fall in love with each other. During a sailing session, Sara develops numbness in her muscles, a degenerative disease she is suffering from. Sara hides her illness from Lorenzo but the truth finally finds its way into their relationship. The story follows the struggle of the couple as they try to deal with the pain and keep their love sparkling.

Cast 
 Elvira Camarrone as Sara
 Roberto Christian as Lorenzo
 Donatella Finocchiaro as Susanna
 Corrado Invernizzi as Boris
 Vincenzo Amato as Antonio
 Manuela Ventura as Tuccia
 Rosalba Battaglia as Doctor
 Daniele Pilli as Mario
 Sofia Migliara as Barbara
 Fabio Orso as Francesco
 Angelica Alleruzzo as Marta
 Giovanni D'Aleo as Gianluca
 Giuseppe Severino as Andrea
 Marta Paris as Caterina
 Marco Feo as Ernesto
 Luciano Saladino as Club Director
 Marta Fullone as Lorenzo's Mother
 Mattia Monien as Lorenzo's Grandmother
 Simona Taormina as ISAF Technical Delegates
 Maurizio Cecconi as ISAF Technical Delegates

References

External links
 
 

2021 films
Italian drama films
2020s Italian-language films
Italian-language Netflix original films
Films set in Sicily
Films set in the 1980s